Matea Bolívar (1773–1886) was a slave owned by the family of Simón Bolívar. 

She was born to parents who were also the Bolívars' slaves. When she was 9, their owners forced her to leave her parents and start working on their plantation in San Mateo. Soon after Simón Bolívar was born, it became her job to raise and teach him. 

Today, she is considered a national heroine in Venezuela. However, she is usually celebrated as a mammy figure.

References

18th-century Venezuelan people
19th-century Venezuelan people
Cultural depictions of slaves
18th-century slaves
19th-century slaves
Slavery in South America
19th-century Venezuelan women